H.V. & C.V. Quick, also known as Quick Den Haag, is a Dutch football and cricket club from The Hague. Since 2017, its first male football squad plays in the Sunday Derde Divisie. Quick is the Dutch National Football Champion of 1908 and Dutch National Cup winner of 1909, 1910, 1911, and 1916.

The cricket departments of both men and women have won the national championship several times. The male department won three times in the second half of the 20th century and twice in the 21st century. The women won the title five times in the 21st century.

Chief coach 
Paul van der Zwaan (since 2015)

References

External links
 

Multi-sport clubs in the Netherlands
Cricket teams in the Netherlands
Football clubs in the Netherlands
Football clubs in The Hague
Sports clubs in The Hague
Association football clubs established in 1896
1896 establishments in the Netherlands